Clarence "Clay" Morrow is a fictional character in the FX television series Sons of Anarchy. He is played by Ron Perlman.  Morrow is one of the original "First 9" members of the Sons of Anarchy Motorcycle Club Redwood Original (SAMCRO), but is not a founding member. He is the former International President of the Sons of Anarchy Motorcycle Club, However, during the fourth season, Clay involves the club in drug smuggling with the cartel for his own protection, wavering in his allegiance, and gradually reveals himself to be one of the story's antagonists. His character is based on King Claudius; the King of Denmark and Prince Hamlet's uncle and father-in-law from William Shakespeare's play Hamlet.

Biography
Morrow was born on February 14, 1949. He has a number of tattoos, most notably a Grim Reaper on his upper right arm and a Paratrooper tattoo on his upper left, along with the words "Death From Above" indicating that he served as a paratrooper in a military unit. On his kutte, he wears patches reading "President", "First 9", "Men of Mayhem" and "Unholy Ones". He also wears a golden pin of the same symbol on his kutte. This symbol is often confused with the US Army Parachutist badge. The Paratrooper symbol that Clay wears is an unofficial symbol, and would serve to indicate service, particularly combat service, as a paratrooper, and consists of a skull, with wings coming from the bottom of the skull, and curving up to meet the top of the skull.

Of the "First 9", he was the youngest and one of only three who was not a war veteran. He did later go on to serve in the military, joining the US Army as an Airborne qualified Infantryman in 1969 and was deployed to Vietnam until 1972 (this is commemorated by a tattoo on his left arm and the paratrooper pin on his vest). When he returned from service, he remained a member of the club and opened the Teller-Morrow Automotive Repair shop with John Teller, the club President and his best friend. While serving as the Vice President during the early 1990s, he was responsible for a number of murders during the SAMCRO-Mayan War, including that of Lowell Harland Sr., a mechanic at the auto shop who became an ATF informant.

In 1993, he became the President of the club's Mother Charter, based in Charming (which also means that he was International President), after the death of John Teller. He went on to marry John Teller's widow Gemma Teller Morrow in the mid-1990s and made their son, Jax Teller, Vice-President. It is later revealed that Clay and Gemma had been having an illicit affair for some time prior to John's death, which John was secretly aware of but did not care about. It is implied that under Morrow, SAMCRO has become more of a criminal enterprise than before, much to Jax's disillusionment.

On his colors he wears patches reading "First 9" and "President". He suffers from osteoarthritis (degenerative arthritis) in his hands that he attempts to mitigate via cortisone injections, but which slowly worsens as the series progresses. He makes several attempts to hide it from his brothers to protect his position as President, as a rule among members of the Sons of Anarchy prevents members from leading if they can't hold the grip of their motorcycle and ride effectively.

Season 1

The Sons find their weapon storage warehouse being burned down. The SOA rush to the scene, where local police officers are already investigating. Clay talks to Sheriff Vic Trammel about the blaze, who claims that propane tanks inside the building blew up, and that he suspects arson due to the boot-prints inside. Trammel then shows Clay the burned corpses of the people hidden beneath the building, who were illegal immigrants. It is later revealed that they were Mexican prostitutes "owned" by the club's Sergeant-at-Arms, Tig Trager. Clay then goes to meet Laroy, the leader of the One-Niners, in the East Bay. He is due to sell guns to the gang, but as they were destroyed, he must explain what happened at the warehouse. Laroy needs the guns to protect their heroin trade from another motorcycle club, the Mayans, and eventually lets Clay have some more time to get more guns together for him. The Sons of Anarchy then work out that it was the Mayans who stole the guns and destroyed the storage warehouse, and decide to get some payback. Juice Ortiz, the club's intelligence officer, finds out where the Mayans stored the guns and Clay, Tig, Jax and Chibs Telford all head out to San Leandro to retrieve them. When they arrive at the industrial storage warehouse and find the guns, three Mayans turn up in a car outside. Clay and Tig then shoot and kill the Mayans. Jax is shot by another man, who has a number of Nazi and White supremacist tattoos. He was a member of the Nordics, a local skinhead gang who are allied with the Mayans, and it later emerges that his name is Whistler. Jax turns around and shoots Whistler twice, killing him. They escape with the weapons and destroy the building using explosives.

Wayne Unser, the Chief of the Charming Police Department, has always gotten on well with the Sons of Anarchy during his time in charge, and has even employed them as muscle, at times. However, he is dying from cancer and will retire at the end of the month, handing power over to his Deputy, David Hale, who is overtly suspicious of the SOA and will almost definitely begin an investigation into the club. To warn Unser to keep Hale off their case, Clay, Bobby Munson (the club's Treasurer) and Opie Winston hijack a shipment that they are supposed to protect, and threaten to hijack more. As a goodwill gesture, they give the contents of the truck to the local Italian American Mafia, as their gun delivery is late. Meanwhile, Tig comes forth and tells Clay that he has been having sex with both of the women found at the warehouse and that his DNA is in the police database. Clay orders Tig and Bobby to get rid of the bodies. The pair then retrieve the corpses from the police site and burn them in a furnace. Hale is enraged when he discovers that the bodies are missing, and he threatens Clay that he will close the SOA down for good.

Local businessman Elliot Oswald goes to Clay after his 13-year-old daughter is raped at a carnival and asks the Sons of Anarchy to hunt down the rapist and kill him, in exchange for money. Clay refuses the money but insists that if they catch him, he must carry out the punishment himself. Juice and Gemma discover that the rapist is one of the carnies and the gang capture him and bring him to Oswald, who tries to castrate him but cannot bring himself to do it. Clay then carries the punishment out, but wears gloves while doing it. He then frames Oswald for the crime, as only Oswald's fingerprints are on the knife, because Oswald was about to sell off much of the land around Charming to big business and housing, which would challenge the SOA's reign over the town. Jax is unhappy that Clay did not tell him of the plan, however, and tells him to always inform him on his future motives.

When a Bureau of Alcohol, Tobacco, Firearms and Explosives agent arrives in Charming and begins investigating the club, Clay decides that they should move their weapons to Indian Hills, Nevada, where their brother club, the Devil's Tribe, are based. He also sends Bobby and Jax to inform the Devil's Tribe that the Sons of Anarchy will be patching over them, and Tig and Juice to steal a truck to transport the guns in. Clay also travels to Indian Hills to perform the patch-over ceremony and brings a number of SOA Washington members as protection in case the Mayans retaliate for an earlier conflict involving Jax, Bobby and five Mayans. At the patch-over party, he has sex with Cherry, a woman whom Half-Sack likes, as revenge for his calling Gemma a MILF earlier. The Mayans eventually retaliate, as predicted, by attacking the Devil's Tribe clubhouse, and a large shootout ensues.

Otto Delaney and a number of other imprisoned SAMCRO members have been protecting Chuck in Stockton prison. He is wanted by the Triads because he stole money from them, then informed on a number of their members when he was arrested. When Clay and Jax visit Otto in prison, he tells them that if they protect Chuck when he is released, he will inform them where the money that he has skimmed from the Asian Triads gang is located. They agree and pick him up from prison and bring him to the clubhouse. SAMCRO intends to wait until the restaurant, where the money is stored, closes before raiding it, but Chuck's frequent unconscious masturbating is unbearable for them and they decide to raid the restaurant straight away. However, just after they steal the money and some counterfeiting plates, the Triads turn up. Instead of starting a war, Clay decides to make a deal; SAMCRO hands over Chuck and the plates for $60,000 from the Triads as the skim money is all counterfeit. Meanwhile, Kyle Hobart, a disgraced former SAMCRO member, goes to Jax and asks him if the Sons want in on his deal selling stolen car parts. Jax accepts and invites him to the clubhouse that night. This was a setup, however, to punish him for not having his SOA tattoo removed after being disowned by the club. At the clubhouse, they tie him up and Tig uses a blowtorch to burn off the tattoo.

Jax and Piney sell five AK-47s to Nate Meineke and his right-wing state militia. They then use these guns to ambush a prison convoy and free one of their members, Frank Cison. Three police officers are killed during the assault. Meineke drops his cell phone at the scene, and his last calls have been to Clay Morrow. When the ATF finds the phone, they arrest Clay and raid the clubhouse. Clay is later released because no evidence is found, meaning he can no longer be kept in custody. Meanwhile, Jax, Piney and Opie Winston decide to kill Meineke and his gang to keep them from snitching if they are apprehended by the authorities. They pretend to sell them more weapons. The "boxes of guns" are actually filled with explosives, however, and the militia load their trucks with them. All of the militia are killed when the bombs are detonated.

Workmen working for the Water and Power Board near the highway dig up three skeletons, two of which were Mayans killed in the war of 1992. The other was Lowell Harland Sr., a mechanic at Teller-Morrow. He was killed for being a "junkie rat". To stop the bodies from being identified, Clay, Jax and Tig break into the local morgue, prepared to steal the bones. However, the corpses have already been identified. When Clay tells Lowell Jr. about his father's death, Lowell runs away. Clay tracks him down and eventually brings him back to town.

Clay is almost killed when the Mayans attempt to shoot him while at a deal with Cameron Hayes of the True IRA at a bar. The two Mayan soldiers are gunned down by Tig and the shotgun-toting barman, however. Clay then calls in the Sons of Anarchy State Presidents and Vice-Presidents from Washington, Utah and Nevada, in a bid to wipe out the Mayans. After the shooting, he questions Jax's commitment to the club and Jax's willingness to kill.

Clay is taken to the local police station for questioning about the recent shootings, by Wayne Unser. Ernest Darby is also being held there, and Clay tells Unser to bring Álvarez in, in order for the three gang leaders to hold a meeting and, hopefully, prevent further bloodshed. He meets with Darby first, and tells him not to retaliate because it would start a war on the streets of Charming. He then meets with Álvarez and the pair make a deal; the Sons of Anarchy will begin selling guns to the Mayans, and all Mayan-SOA disputes (over turf, businesses, etc.) end in the SOA's favor. Álvarez also gives the Sons permission to kill Esai, as revenge for the attempted hit on Clay.

After the clubhouse is raided and Bobby is arrested for the murder of Brenan Hefner, Clay and Tig suspect Opie of being the witness who identified him. It was another person, however. When Opie turns up at the clubhouse, Tig checks his car for bugs and finds a microphone. He also finds a recording device in Opie's mobile phone. Both were planted by the ATF without Opie's knowledge. Clay and Tig then decide to kill him.

Clay and Tig again meet with One-Niners' leader Laroy, and they discuss taking out the Mayans. They agree that the Sons would meet the Mayans for an arms deal and when they left, the Niners would eliminate the Mayans and take the guns as payment. However, when Clay, Tig, Opie and Jax meet Álvarez and his crew at a warehouse in Oakland, the Niners try to take out the Mayans and SOA. The group escapes, but a number of Mayans and Niners are killed in the shootout. Tig attempts to kill Opie during the havoc, but finds himself unable to do so. Later on at Jax's son Abel's homecoming party, Tig follows Opie's car home and shoot the driver dead. However, the driver is Opie's wife, Donna, who has switched vehicles with Opie. Just after Tig leave to kill Opie, Clay is approached by Wayne Unser and told that Opie is, in fact, not an informant and that the ATF has set him up. Clay tries to phone Tig to tell him, but Tig is not carrying his phone.

Rosen, the club's lawyer, meets with Clay and tells him that the ATF has put a warrant out for Opie's arrest and that he will most likely get convicted of Hefner's murder because of the witness. Clay, Tig and Juice then meet with Vic Trammel and offer him money to reveal the location of the witness. Trammell does not know, however, so they go to Elliot Oswald. They again blackmail him with the knife that he used to kill the rapist earlier in the season, this time to get his friends in the US Attorney's office to tell him the witness' case number and location. He then sends Chibs, Happy and Tig to kill the witness, who is at a safe house in San Joaquin. Jax goes to the safe house and stops the trio from killing the witness, but threatens her into leaving the state. At Church, Jax confronts Clay and asks if he killed Donna. Clay denies this. Season One ends at Donna's funeral, which is attended by Sons of Anarchy from all over the country. There, Jax and Clay stare at each other and it is plain to see that the club is coming apart from inside.

Season 2

In the first episode of Season Two we see that Clay is still struggling with remorse for what he did to Donna, and that he is going head to head with Jax over her death. We see him giving Opie a fake story of how a Mayan MC member killed Donna and he throws a welcome back party for Bobby.  When Ethan Zobelle and the L.O.A.N. start threatening members of SAMCRO, Clay is all for immediate retaliation, but he is at odds with Jax, who feels the club may be walking into a trap.

He has recently learned of his wife Gemma's rape at the hands of L.O.A.N. and settled his differences with Jax, so the two can work together to get revenge.  Clay is now shown to be more in tune with Jax's method of operation, opting to do more recon work before entering potentially lethal situations.

In the season two finale, Clay neglects to inform Marcus Alvarez that Ethan Zobelle is an F.B.I. informant, knowing the Mayan leader would kill Zobelle himself, forfeiting Clay's opportunity to do the deed.  Later in the episode, the Sons ambush the Mayan convoy containing Zobelle and Clay spares Alvarez's life.  Clay and the others corner Zobelle in a deli, but decide to abandon the scene after learning of his grandson's kidnapping.  He is last seen consoling his distraught stepson Jax, whose son Abel (Clay's grandson) has been kidnapped by IRA gun dealer Cameron Hayes.

Season 3

In the first episodes we see that Clay is still saddened by the loss of Abel, and is willing to help Jax at all costs. Also, his arthritis continues to worsen. As shown in the episode "Home", it got so bad that Jax had to tie Clay's hands to the handlebars. In the episode "Turas", when SAMCRO are nearly killed by a bomb hidden in a gun shipment put there by the SAMBEL Sergeant-at-Arms, Jax has a shell shocked vision of his biological father speaking to him but it turns out to actually be Clay. In the episode "Firinne", Clay kills McGee, member of the First 9 and President of the Belfast Chapter, for his treachery against the club by pushing him off a roof after taking his cut.  He later burns the cut after expressing remorse for the killing. In the Season 3 finale, when Clay learns of Jax's betrayal, he appears enraged and says "Jax will die". In the end, it is revealed that he knew of Jax's deal with Stahl and that it was part of a plan to execute Jimmy O. and Stahl. When the plan is done, Clay and the others share a laugh, much to the confusion of the ATF agents. Also in the end of the episode, as Tara is reading the letters John Teller wrote to Maureen Ashby, Teller says he fears that Clay and Gemma will kill him because of his betraying Gemma by having an affair and attempting to alter the clubs focus on criminal activity, leading to much speculation that Clay and Gemma might have killed John Teller.

Season 4

Clay is seen as one of the many SAMCRO members released from prison. He later escapes their sheriff tail and accompanies Jax and Opie's meeting with the Russians, where he settles their differences and forms a partnership with them. He attends Opie's wedding and goes to test a new gun given to them by Putlova. As he's firing the gun he turns and shoots Putlova's bodyguards and Jax stabs Putlova to death as revenge for trying to kill him in prison. He also tells Gemma that his arthritis has gotten worse and that he has only 1 or 2 years left before he has to step down as President of SAMCRO. Also, while in prison, he set up a deal to run cocaine for the Gallindo Cartel, but this does not sit well with the other members of the club, as SOA avoids drugs. When the club goes to Arizona and meets the Tucson charter, SAMTAZ, he demands that the charter stop dealing meth. This request is denied, as selling generates too much money for the club to give up. Otto wants Luann's murderer dead, and the issue is raised in the chapel. Clay is then confronted by Piney, who threatens Clay that if Clay does not kill the cocaine deal with the Gallindo Cartel, Piney will distribute letters to the club about John Teller's murder to the other members. Clay discusses the threat with Gemma, revealing that Clay did kill Teller. Clay later meets Unser and obtains the letters from him, unaware that Gemma has the same plan. After Unser gets a copy of the letters, he confronts Clay. Clay replies he does not regret doing what he did because it protected the Club and Charming. When he visits a tied Georgie Caruso, he claims that he has connections with millionaire Japanese families. Clay immediately sees an opportunity to make Jacob Hale believe he has investors in time. His idea is that he will have the investors pull out at the last minute, which will put an end to Charming Heights. After retrieving the last brick of cocaine that Juice had stolen, framing Miles for it, Clay asks Romeo for help killing Tara, to keep the secret of the letters hidden.

Clay comes to Piney's cabin in the night. After discussing trust issues and differences in the cabin, Clay leaves, only to break down the door, knocking Piney off his feet.  Piney begs Clay not to get Tara involved in the letters from JT.  Clay shoots Piney in the chest with a shotgun, killing him.  This makes Piney the 3rd member of the First 9, and the 2nd and final co-founding member of the Sons of Anarchy to be killed at the hands of Clay.  Clay leaves the markings of the cartel to implicate them for the murder. Given the club's difficult circumstances, Clay calls the Irish Kings for a meeting to set a new deal that lets them survive the war against Lobo Sonora. He later learns that the One Niners have been dealing with the Sonora and the Sons plan an attack using the Niners to lure them.  This fails, however, as Sonora's men were equipped with grenade launchers. Luis, Romero's right-hand man, gives Clay a cell phone with his contact to kill Tara. Jax confronts Clay when he hears from Bobby that Clay wanted Bobby, instead of Opie, as president as was the deal.  Clay says it is Tara's fault that Jax changed, but Jax warns him to never insult her like that again. Gemma tells Clay that Tara will not reveal the letters to Jax for fear that Jax will get deeper into the club out of guilt. Clay promises to Gemma he won't hurt Tara, however he uses the cell phone Luis gave him, and the next morning pays the contact 25,000 dollars for the murder. After finding out that Jax and the babies are with her, Clay desperately tries to stop the hit, but is unsuccessful and Tara has her hand broken by a car door while struggling to escape. Clay meets Romeo and gets a refund, with Romeo taking the matter into his hands personally, and Clay reluctantly agrees that Tara is best dead. Gemma confronts Clay about the hit and a violent fight ensues between the two, including Gemma shooting at Clay (deliberately missing) and getting in a powerful punch and a kick against Clay, with Clay getting injured, but Clay gets the upper hand and severely beats Gemma's face. That night he decides to sleep in the clubhouse. Opie later finds out that Clay was behind the death of Piney and seeks revenge, ending up shooting Clay in the torso twice. Clay survives the shooting but is shown to be in intensive care. Later in the episode Gemma gave Jax his father's letters to Maureen Ashby.  After reading the letters, and realizing Clay is responsible for the death of John Teller, Jax vows to kill Clay. Jax puts a knife up to Clay's throat and makes him step down as President and orders him to never go near his family again. Although Clay tries to explain his reasons, Jax refuses to listen and takes his President patch, thus ending Clay's reign as President of SAMCRO.

Season 5

Clay is shown to have been discharged from the hospital, but requires an oxygen tank due to his lung injury. He is shown trying to make amends with Gemma, but she coldly brushes him off. He later reveals to the club he murdered Piney, but states that Piney was drunk and tried to kill him first and Opie found out and is the one who shot him. The club's rules (due to him having killed a member) means they must vote on kicking him out. When Jax questions his motives for telling the club, he denies any. His arthritis is shown to have reached the point to where he can't ride his bike at all. He later goes to his and Gemma's burglarized house and expresses concern over his safe being stolen. He then goes and visits Opie and convinces him not to walk away from the club because of him, seeing as though he's "half dead already". He later finds out where Gemma has been going from Juice. He goes to the brothel and confronts Nero, the owner and Gemma's new suitor. He then "seeks comfort" with a young prostitute to anger Gemma. Gemma then attacks the girl causing her to leave. When Nero's operation is later shut down, and he and Gemma are arrested, it's likely Clay was behind it.

The next episode "Small World" shows Clay having recovered to the point of no longer needing his oxygen tank, though he continues to wear it (either for sympathy or to keep people off-guard). He later helps Gemma take care of a dead body (Nero's half-sister) and the two seem to be on better terms. At the end of the episode, he confronts the three Nomads responsible for the Charming burglaries and the death of Sheriff Roosevelt's wife. He punches one in the face exclaiming "You weren't supposed to kill her!" This shows Clay to have been pulling the strings behind the home invasions. The next episode "Toad's Wild Ride" reveals the Nomads, (Go-Go, Greg and Frankie) made a deal with Clay to help him get back at the head of the table in exchange for a cut of Clay's share of the guns and cocaine money. The break-ins were Clay's way of turning Charming against Jax. When Unser (who has been investigating the break-ins) comes close to discovering the truth, Go-Go and Greg meet with Clay to discuss killing him, while Frankie goes underground. Clay meets with Unser in his trailer talking about the trust and friendship between them. When Go-Go and Greg break in the door, Unser shoots Go-Go with a double-barreled shotgun and Clay betrays them, shooting Greg in the head with his pistol. When Juice (who saw Go-Go and Greg going to Unser's trailer) asks Clay what is happening, Clay denies involvement. Jax and the rest of the club find out about their attack on Unser and Jax privately accuses Clay of using the Nomads to undermine his leadership. Clay states that Pope is the one who hired the Nomads, Jax claims they'll find Frankie and learn the truth. In "Ablation" Clay visits Gemma, Abel, and Thomas in the hospital after a marijuana-induced car crash. He tells Jax that a truck ran her off the road to protect her. When Jax learns about the lie, he tells Clay he understands why he lied and that Gemma is dead to his family, and he wants him to take care of her. "Andare Pascare" shows the club discovering that Frankie is hiding with a Mafia family, paying them with money stolen from Nero. They take a unanimous vote to kill him after extracting the information they need. When Clay learns from Jimmy Cacuzza the location of a Mafia safehouse where Frankie is hiding, Clay and Juice go there to kill him to keep him from outing Clay (Juice acting under the pretense of scouting it out). When Frankie barricades himself in the house and shoots at the two, Clay drives the van into the gas tank outside, blowing up the house. Just as Clay is about to kill Frankie, Jax and the others show up, having seen the explosion. However Frankie is quickly gunned down by the enraged Mafia Don for killing one of his men before he can tell them anything. Bobby later asks Clay if there's anything he wants to tell him (implying he also knows about his dealings with the Nomads). When Clay claims his conscience is clear, Bobby states "I hope you're as smart as you think you are, cause I'm sicking of burning friends". The episode ends with Gemma coming to Clay to help him with his cortisone shots.

The next episode "Crucifixed" shows Clay negotiating with Romeo and Luis for protection as once the RICO case is gone, he will no longer need Clay and will most likely kill him. Romeo suggests getting rid of Jax and putting Clay back at the head of the table. Clay disagrees to taking the deal, Romeo states "Yes you will." Later, Gemma and Clay draw closer at Clay's place, where Gemma insists they return home. They are last seen sitting on their bed talking, where Clay confesses he can't bear losing her again. Gemma kisses him passionately and they sink onto the bed. The next episode "To Thine Own Self" shows Clay learning of Otto's murder of a nurse, ending the RICO case. He is shown, for unknown reasons, trying to save Jax from Romeo and warns him to work with the cartel long enough to make the Club legitimate and leave. He refuses stating "I'm done bowing down to greedy men who have nothing to believe in". When Jax reveals a new deal to the Club, which would allow the Mayans and Triads to take over muling the cocaine and selling big guns, respectively, Clay votes yes along with everyone else. He is later shown moving legal documents given to him by the Nomads to another location, to protect himself from the Club finding this important evidence of his betrayal. The end of the episode shows Bobby going to Clay and Gemma's house to talk to him about "trying to keep you alive." It's revealed in "Darthy" that Bobby convinced Clay to confess his role in the Nomad attacks in exchange for vetoing his death: club-sanctioned assassinations (known as "A Visit from Mr. Mayhem") require a unanimous vote. Clay also meets with Gaylen, tells him he plans on starting his own crew to run any guns SAMCRO doesn't pick up, and asks for a plane to Belfast to wait out any immediate danger. He also gives Juice a gun that he values for all he has done for him. At the end of the episode, Clay has been voted out of the club after revealing everything. After Jax beats Clay in frustration for not being allowed to kill him, Happy removes the former Club President's SAMCRO tattoos on his back and arm by smudging them over with a needle and black tattoo ink as the rest of the club looks on.

He is shown to be ready to leave in the season finale when Roosevelt and several policemen state they found his gun (the same one he gave Juice) at a crime scene as the murder weapon that killed Damon Pope and three of his men. When he asks Gemma to vouch for him, she states he was gone with the gun and she didn't know he was going to kill anyone. He is arrested and is last seen in a prison transport van with two black men. Meanwhile, Jax has convinced Pope's lieutenants that Clay was Pope's killer; per Pope's standing order in the event of his death, they offer a $5 million reward for Clay's murder.

Season 6

At the beginning of the season, Clay is being held in protective custody after his arrest for Damon Pope's murder. Clay is visited by retired US Marshall Lee Toric, the brother of the nurse Otto murdered. Toric, who had sworn revenge against the motorcycle club, tells Clay he can only remain in protective custody if he cooperates in building a case against SAMCRO. Clay initially refuses, but after being transferred to general population and realizing he is certain to be murdered in retaliation for two deaths he had nothing to do with and didn't even approve, he agrees to help Toric and is returned to protective custody. He later demands a sit-down with Gemma and Jax before he signs the deal. He meets with Gemma and seems apologetic, though Gemma suspects he has ulterior motives. He meets Jax and states that he will give Toric nothing and that he is sorry. In response to this he is shipped to Stockton, where  he is attacked by three black men, but they spare him and offer him a shank. He later uses it to kill a member of a Neo-Nazi group and gets protection from the black gang. He is visited once more by Toric, who shows him the brutalized Otto. Clay slips Otto a shank and leaves. Despite threats that he will meet the same fate, Clay refuses to sign. Toric is later killed by Otto with the shank Clay gave him and Otto is killed by the guards in response.

Following the fallout between Jax and the IRA, Clay is contacted by Galen O'Shea with the opportunity to continue as the main weapon distributor for the IRA in Northern California.  The IRA will arrange to have Clay escape from the prison transport on the way to his hearing and he will retreat to Belfast and build his own new crew.  Clay requests a conjugal visit with Gemma so that he can have her relate this information to Jax.  He pays off two guards to allow him to chat with Gemma, but when the visit is over, the guards demand to watch Clay and Gemma have sex while they masturbate.  They threaten to have Clay killed and Gemma grudgingly agrees to do it.  Afterwards Clay vows to kill the two guards, but Gemma tells him that SAMCRO needs him alive. When Clay's transport date is moved up, Galen enlists SAMCRO to assist in attacking his transport truck to free him; Bobby is shot during the attack and Juice kills a guard. After meeting up with the Irish, Jax kills Galen and his men. He explains the situation, stating the Club took a unanimous vote how to handle the situation. Clay, accepting of his fate, stands ready. Jax then executes Clay by shooting him in the neck and then five times in the chest while he is on the floor. Jax then arranges the bodies to make it look like Clay had a falling out with the Irish and they all died in a shootout, allowing him to finally get revenge against Clay as well as Galen.

Development
Originally, Scott Glenn was cast in the role of Clay Morrow and the first pilot episode was filmed with him. However, series creator Kurt Sutter decided to go in a different direction with the character and re-cast Perlman in the role, and Clay's scenes were re-shot for the pilot episode that aired.

References

Sons of Anarchy characters
Television characters introduced in 2008
Fictional businesspeople
Fictional crime bosses
Fictional gang members
Fictional gangsters
Fictional mechanics
Fictional mass murderers
Fictional outlaws
Fictional prison escapees
Fictional torturers
Fictional vigilantes
Fictional United States Army personnel
Fictional Vietnam War veterans
Fictional Irish American people